Utila Fort is a fort in Gwalior district in Madhya Pradesh, India.

History
It was constructed by Bhim Singh Rana of Gohad State in 1740. It was mainly constructed to provide defense to Gohad Fort.

Architecture
The fort is situated on a hillock and is guarded by a deep trench which surrounds it. There are four high towers or burj surrounding the fort, the architecture of which reflects the defense strategy and architectural skills of the Gohad Jat rulers.

References 

Villages in Gwalior district
Forts in Madhya Pradesh
Buildings and structures of the Jats